Martin McCann may refer to:
Martin McCann (actor) (born 1983), actor from Northern Ireland
Martin McCann (singer), singer in the Dublin-based band Sack and a DJ of the Dublin gay scene